Minuscule 128 (in the Gregory-Aland numbering), ε 304 (Soden), is a Greek minuscule manuscript of the New Testament, on parchment leaves. Palaeographically it has been assigned to the 13th century. It has marginalia.

Description 

The codex contains a complete text of the four Gospels on 370 parchment leaves (size ). The text is written in one column per page, 18 lines per page. Parchment is white, ink is brown, the initial letters in red. The handwriting is like that in minuscule 80.

There is room for pictures.

Text 

The Greek text of the codex is a representative of the Byzantine text-type. Hermann von Soden classified it to the textual family Kr. Aland placed it in Category V.

According to the Claremont Profile Method it belongs to the textual family Kr in Luke 1, Luke 10, and Luke 20. It creates textual cluster 128.

The text of the Pericope Adulterae (John 7:53-8:11) is marked as a doubtful.

History 

The manuscript was examined by Birch (about 1782), who dated it to the 11th century. Gregory saw it in 1886.

It is currently housed at the Vatican Library (Vat. gr. 356), at Rome.

See also 

 List of New Testament minuscules
 Biblical manuscript
 Textual criticism

References

Further reading 
 

Greek New Testament minuscules
13th-century biblical manuscripts
Manuscripts of the Vatican Library